Elena L. Grigorenko (born January 4, 1965) is an American clinical psychologist and the Hugh Roy and Lillie Cranz Cullen Distinguished Professor of Psychology at the University of Houston, where she has taught since September 2015. She is also a professor in the Department of Molecular and Human Genetics at Baylor College of Medicine.

Biography
Grigorenko received her Ph.D. in general psychology from Moscow State University in Moscow, Russia in 1990, and her Ph.D. in developmental psychology and genetics from Yale University in 1996. Before joining the faculty of the University of Houston, she was the Emily Fraser Beede Professor of Developmental Disabilities, Child Studies, Psychology, and Epidemiology and Public Health at Yale University.

Honors and awards
Grigorenko has received the American Psychological Association's Distinguished Award for Early Career Contribution to Developmental Psychology and the American Educational Research Association Sylvia Scribner Award, among other awards.

References

External links

1965 births
Living people
American women psychologists
20th-century American psychologists
University of Houston faculty
Baylor College of Medicine faculty
Moscow State University alumni
Yale University alumni
Yale University faculty
American women academics
21st-century American psychologists
Russian psychologists
Russian women psychologists
21st-century American women
American clinical psychologists